Paul Collier  is a British physicist and the Head of Beams Department (BE) at CERN. He has worked on the Large Electron-Positron Collider (LEP), the Super Proton Synchrotron (SPS) and the Large Hadron Collider (LHC), either through engineering contributions or leadership over 25 years.

Biography and career 
In 1982, Collier went to Sheffield Hallam University to study for a PhD in applied physics. He later became a lecturer in applied physics and electrical engineering at the same university.

Collier now works at The European Organization for Nuclear Research better known as CERN. He started at CERN in January 1987, as part of a 3-year fellows training program for young scientist and engineers. During his program, he worked on the construction and installation of the radio frequency accelerating system for the accelerator LEP. At the end of the 3-year program, he was recruited as an engineer and sent to work in the operations group.

Collier is the head of Beams Department at CERN. He has been in that role since 2009. The Beams department's task is to operate the accelerators at CERN. The department has around 600 people, approximately 400 are staff members and the rest are students, fellows and industrial support staff.

Memberships and honors 

 Fellow of the Royal Academy of Engineering (FREng), 2015
Order of the British Empire (OBE) Queen's Birthday Honours Overseas list, June 2019

References

External links

Fellows of the Royal Academy of Engineering
British physicists
People associated with CERN
Year of birth missing (living people)
Living people
Alumni of Sheffield Hallam University
Academics of Sheffield Hallam University